Jo Ling Kent (born May 11, 1984) is an American reporter. She is currently a correspondent for NBC News, and previously worked as a reporter on Fox Business Network, ABC, and CNN.

Early life and education 
Jo Ling Kent was born in San Francisco, California to Shean Yen Janice Kent and David Kent, and raised in Minnetonka, Minnesota. There, she attended Hopkins High School. She was an undergraduate at Rice University and earned graduate degrees in international affairs from both the London School of Economics and Peking University. Kent was also a Fulbright scholar at Peking University Law School Center.

Career 
In 2008, after graduating from college, Kent worked as a translator and writer for ABC News in Beijing. Kent would return to Beijing to work for CNN as an associate producer after graduating from the London School of Economics. On February 27, 2011 while working as a field producer during the 2011 Chinese pro-democracy protests in Beijing, Kent and CNN reporter Eunice Yoon were detained by police in Wangfujing for half an hour. They had been reporting on the protests when an officer knocked Kent’s camera out of her hands and physically forced them into a bank where they were detaining several other journalists.

In 2012, Kent joined NBC's affiliate WVIT in Connecticut as a field reporter and blogger. There she extensively covered the 2012 presidential election as an embedded reporter, and her team won a Peabody Award for coverage of the Sandy Hook Elementary School shooting. She joined Fox Business Network in 2013 as a technology reporter.

Since 2016, Kent has been a correspondent with NBC News. In June, 2020, Kent was in the field reporting on the George Floyd protests in Seattle, Washington when she was hit on-air by a Seattle Police Department flash-bang grenade. The device burnt part of her clothing but she was not significantly injured.

During her second pregnancy in April, 2021, Kent received a COVID-19 vaccine shot on air during a report about the vaccine and pregnancy.

Personal life 
Kent has been married to Scott Conroy, an author and reporter for HuffPost, since 2015. The couple have two daughters, one born in 2018 and another in April 2021.

She is fluent in Mandarin Chinese.

References

External links 

 Jo Ling Kent on Muck Rack

1984 births
Living people
NBC News people
American television hosts
American women television journalists
American television reporters and correspondents
American women television presenters
Peking University alumni
Rice University alumni
Hopkins High School alumni
21st-century American women